Francis Johnston may refer to:
Francis Johnston (architect) (1760–1829), Irish architect
Francis Earl Johnston (1871–1917), New Zealand army officer
Francis Johnston (bishop) (1891–1963), third Bishop of Egypt

See also
Frank Johnston (disambiguation)
Francis Johnson (disambiguation)